Wallpack or Walpack may refer to the following in Sussex County, New Jersey in the United States:

Walpack Township, New Jersey
Wallpack Ridge
Wallpack Valley